"Don't Make Em Like You" is a song by American singer-songwriter Ne-Yo, first released on SoundCloud on October 3, 2012 and then for digital download on October 22, 2012 as the third single for his fifth studio album R.E.D. (2012). The song features American rapper Wiz Khalifa and was produced by Harmony.

Charts

Release history

References

2012 singles
2012 songs
Ne-Yo songs
Wiz Khalifa songs
Motown singles
Songs written by Ne-Yo
Songs written by Harmony Samuels
Song recordings produced by Harmony Samuels
Songs written by Wiz Khalifa